The Emilia-Romagna regional election of 2010 took place on 28–29 March 2010.

The two-term incumbent President of the Region, Vasco Errani of the centre-left Democratic Party defeated Anna Maria Bernini (backed by The People of Freedom and Lega Nord Emilia-Romagna) and Gian Luca Galletti (Union of the Centre).

Errani (–10.6% compared to 2005) and the Democrats (–7.7%) lost ground to the Five Star Movement, whose candidate won a surprising 7.0% of the vote, in what was the worst result for the centre-left in a regional election in Emilia–Romagna. The other surprise of the election was Lega Nord, which gained 13.7% of the vote, up from 4.8% in 2005.

Electoral system
Regional elections in Emilia-Romagna were ruled by the "Tatarella law" (approved in 1995), which provided for a mixed electoral system: four fifths of the regional councilors were elected in provincial constituencies by proportional representation, using the largest remainder method with a droop quota and open lists, while the residual votes and the unassigned seats were grouped into a "single regional constituency", where the whole ratios and the highest remainders were divided with the Hare method among the provincial party lists; one fifth of the council seats instead was reserved for regional lists and assigned with a majoritarian system: the leader of the regional list that scored the highest number of votes was elected to the presidency of the Region while the other candidates were elected regional councilors.

A threshold of 3% had been established for the provincial lists, which, however, could still have entered the regional council if the regional list to which they were connected had scored at least 5% of valid votes.

The panachage was also allowed: the voter can indicate a candidate for the presidency but prefer a provincial list connected to another candidate.

Parties and candidates

Results

References

2010 elections in Italy
2010 regional election
2010
March 2010 events in Italy